is a passenger railway station located in the city of Tokushima, Tokushima Prefecture, Japan. It is operated by JR Shikoku and has the station number "B03".

Lines
Only trains from the local service stop at the station.

Layout
The station, which is unstaffed, consists of a side platform serving a single track on an embankment. There is no station building, only a shelter on the platform for waiting passengers. A flight of steps leads up the embankment to the platform from the access road. At the base of the steps is a "tickets corner" (a shelter housing a ticket vending machine), a public telephone call box and a paved area for the parking of bicycles.

Adjacent stations

History
The station was opened on 20 September 1934 by Japanese Government Railways (JGR) on the then Tokushima Main Line. With the privatization of Japanese National Railways (JNR), the successor of JGR, on 1 April 1987, the station came under the control of JR Shikoku. On 1 June 1988, the line was renamed the Tokushima Line.

Passenger statistics
In fiscal 2017, the station was used by an average of 233 passengers daily

Surrounding area
The area around the station is a residential area on the outskirts of Tokushima city.
Tokushima Prefectural Josei High School
Tokushima City Kamona Elementary School
Tokushima City Kamona Junior High Scho

See also
 List of Railway Stations in Japan

References

External links

 JR Shikoku timetable

Railway stations in Tokushima Prefecture
Railway stations in Japan opened in 1934
Tokushima (city)